Konrad Gruszkowski (born 27 January 2001) is a Polish professional footballer who plays as a right-back for Wisła Kraków.

Career statistics

References

External links

2001 births
Living people
Polish footballers
Poland youth international footballers
Poland under-21 international footballers
Association football defenders
Wisła Kraków players
Motor Lublin players
Ekstraklasa players
III liga players